Out to Canaan is a novel written by American author Jan Karon. It is the fourth book of The Mitford Years series.

List of characters
 Father Tim
 Cynthia
 Barnabas
 Dooley Barlowe
 Lace

Plot
As the story of Father Tim's Episcopalian Mitford parish continues, he finds himself in the very thick of things. Far from the bachelor life he knew for 62 years, he now finds himself opening his home to a myriad of friends, neighbors, and other lost souls, each giving new meaning to his God-centered life.

1999 American novels
Novels by Jan Karon
Novels set in North Carolina